Mackenzie Airport  is located  south of Mackenzie, British Columbia, Canada.

References

External links

Registered aerodromes in British Columbia
Regional District of Fraser-Fort George